Elections in Cuba are held at municipal, provincial, and national levels. Cuba is a one-party state, with the Communist Party of Cuba being described as the "superior driving force of the society and the state" in the Constitution of Cuba, and all other political parties being illegal. Elections in Cuba are not considered democratic because the government does not allow free and fair voting. 

There are currently 605 seats in the National Assembly of People's Power, Cuba's unicameral legislature, which is scheduled to decrease to 474 after the 2023 elections. There is only one candidate for each seat in the Assembly, with all being nominated by committees that are firmly controlled by the Communist Party. Most legislative districts elect multiple representatives to the Assembly. Voters can select individual candidates on their ballot, select every candidate, or leave every question blank, with no option to vote against candidates. During the 2013 elections, around 80% of voters selected every candidate for the Assembly on their ballot, while 4.6% submit a blank ballot; no candidate for the Assembly has lost an election in Cuban history.  

The National Assembly only is in session twice per year, with the Council of State exercising the legislative authority throughout the rest of the year. The 21 members of the Council of State are elected by the Assembly, and a 2021 study determined that most members of the Council may have been defeated if they were elected by the people instead.

Fidel Castro was the First Secretary of the Communist Party of Cuba (PCC) from 1961 until 2011, and was in power first as Prime Minister and then as President, from 1959 until 2008. Castro's brother Raúl Castro was designated Fidel's successor at the 5th Communist Party congress in October 1997.  Fidel Castro officially retired on 19 April 2011, leaving his brother as the sole candidate for First Secretary.

Procedure
According to the constitution, Cuba is a socialist republic where all members or representative bodies of state power are elected and subject to recall and the masses control the activity of the state agencies, the deputies, delegates and officials. Elections in Cuba have two phases:

election of delegates to the Municipal Assembly, and
election of deputies to the National Assembly.

Candidates for municipal assemblies are nominated on an individual basis at local levels by the local population at nomination assemblies. Candidates for the National Assembly are nominated by the municipal assemblies from lists compiled by national and municipal candidacy commissions. Suggestions for nominations are made at all levels mainly by mass organizations, trade unions, people's councils, and student federations. The final list of candidates for the National Assembly, one for each district, is drawn up by the National Candidacy Commission.

Provincial assemblies were eliminated in 2019, and provisional governors are proposed by the President of Cuba and approved by municipal assemblies, with no provisional elections occurring.

Anyone older than 16 other than those mentally incapacitated, imprisoned, or deprived of their political rights can vote and be nominated to these posts. Voters consult candidates' biographies and photographs posted on public locations. All elections take place by secret ballot. Suffrage is afforded to Cuban citizens resident for two years on the island who are aged over sixteen years and who have not been found guilty of a criminal offense.

Municipal elections

The election of municipal assembly delegates involves nomination by voters in nomination assemblies, compilation of posting of candidate biographies, voting by secret ballot, and recall. Deputies of the municipal assemblies are elected every 5 years. Municipal legislative elections are officially non-partisan.

Nomination assemblies are held about a month before the election in areas within the electoral districts. During regular elections, from 70% to over 90% of the electorate attend the nomination assemblies. Municipal candidates must be at least 16 years old.

In elections held on 21 October 2007, turnout was reported to be 8.1 million voters, approximately 95% of the population eligible to vote, which was less than the last such election on April 17, 2005, where voter turnout was 97%.  Elections were then held in 2010 and 2013.

National elections 

Cuba's national legislature, the National Assembly of People's Power, has 605 members who sit for five-year terms. Members of the National Assembly represent multiple-member constituencies (2 to 5 members per district), with one Deputy for each 20,000 inhabitants.

Candidates for the National Assembly are chosen by candidacy commissions chaired by local trade union officials and composed of elected representatives of "mass organisations" representing workers, youth, women, students and farmers. The provincial and municipal candidacy commissions submit nominations to the National Candidacy Commission. The municipal candidacy commissions produce slates of recommended candidates for each electoral district, mainly submit nominations for candidates that are also municipal delegates, and first submit their nominations to their municipal assembly who may approve or replace nominations. The final list of candidates for the National Assembly, one for each district, is drawn up by the National Candidacy Commission, taking into account criteria such as candidates’ popularity, merit, patriotism, ethical values and "revolutionary history". At least half of the National Assembly candidates selected must have been previously elected as delegates to these assemblies.

Although there is only one candidate per seat, candidates must still obtain the support of 50% of voters to be elected. If a candidate were to fail to garner 50% of the vote, a new candidate would have to be chosen. However, this has never occurred.

Elections to the National Assembly were held on 24 February 2008. According to the Cuban Ministry of External Affairs, at the October 2002 elections to the Candidacy Commissions which preceded the January 2003 National Assembly elections, "32,585 candidates were nominated for the 14,949 seats up for election in October 2001 at grassroots assemblies in which 81.7% of the voters participated." So far no candidate for the National Assembly has ever failed to gain 50% of the vote, because the candidates put forward by the candidacy commissions usually receive at least 69.48% support.

Right of legislative proposals 

Article 88(h) of the Cuban constitution, adopted in 1976, provides for citizen proposals of law, prerequisite that the proposal be made by at least 10,000 citizens who are eligible to vote.  In 2002 supporters of a movement known as the Varela Project submitted a citizen proposal of law with 11,000 signatures calling for a national referendum on political and economic reforms.

The Cuban National Assembly Constitution and Legal Affairs Committee tabled the Varela Project citizens' initiative and responded with a counter initiative, the petition for which collected 8.1 million signatures, to request that Cuba's National Assembly amend the constitution to state "Socialism and the revolutionary political and social system...are irrevocable; and Cuba will never again return to capitalism." At the same time, millions of Cubans took to the street. The BBC reported that some citizens had felt pressured to sign the government petition.
The national legislature meets twice a year for a week, to pass unanimously all the bills proposed by the executive branch. In between the sessions, the Council of State and the NAPP's commissions perform its legislative duties.

Political parties 

The Communist Party of Cuba is the official state party and Cuba is a one-party state; the single-party system is enshrined in Article 5 of the Cuban Constitution.

In 1965, the 26th of July Movement, Popular Socialist Party, and 13th of March Revolutionary Directorate were all merged into a single Communist Party under Fidel Castro. All other political parties were dissolved and banned. For decades, no opposition candidates were permitted to stand for office. Campaigning is not permitted in elections in Cuba; rather, photographs and biographies of candidates are publicly posted. In 2015, two dissident candidates (one independent, and one member of the outlawed Independent and Democratic Cuba Party founded by Huber Matos) stood for election to a Havana local council, the first openly declared opposition candidates to seek office since 1959. However, both were defeated.

Comments

Political scientists
Political scientists do not consider elections in Cuba to be democratic. The electoral process is firmly controlled by authoritarian Cuban regime. 

William M. LeoGrande, in a paper written for the Cuba Transition Project at the Institute for Cuban and Cuban-American Studies at the University of Miami, wrote of the 1992 election law: "unprecedented openness in debate, not just among party members, but also among the entire populace, so as to foster greater participation and build 'the necessary consensus' for the government's policy response...Eventually, some three million people participated in the pre-Congress discussions", but "When the new electoral law was finalized… it dashed any hopes for a significant opening to alternative voices. The ban on campaigning was retained, and the nomination of provincial and national assembly candidates was entrusted to Candidacy Commissions. Through an elaborate process of consultation… the Candidacy Commissions… produced slates of nominees with just one candidate per seat. Voters only had the choice of voting yes or no. Thus, the election process at the provincial and national levels avoided the possibility of even implicit policy differences among candidates.”

Cuba

Fidel Castro made many statements affirming that Cuba is a democracy or has democratic features. In 1960, Castro made a speech to the General Assembly referring to Cuba in relation to other Latin American nations, “We are speaking of democracy. If Government is of people and democratic, people can be consulted, as we are doing here. What is more an example of pure democracy than meetings such as this one. If they cannot call such meetings they are not democracies.” Castro continued “Those who want to see people’s democracy let them come here and see this. We can speak to America and the world because we speak in names of a whole nation.” In this 1960 speech, Castro also criticized many Latin American liberal democracies, describing them as a “Pretense of democracy”, as, he claimed, they did not allow such gatherings.

In 2006, President of Cuba's National Assembly, Ricardo Alarcón de Quesada, stated: "At some moment, US rhetoric changed to talk of democracy ... For me, the starting point is the recognition that democracy should begin with Pericles's definition – that society is for the benefit of the majority – and should not be imposed from outside."

Cuba justifies the existence of only one political party by arguing that the PCC “is not a political party in the traditional sense…  it is not an electoral party; it does not decide on the formation or composition of the government. It is not only forbidden to nominate candidates but also to be involved in any other stage of the electoral process… The PCC’s role is one of guidance, supervision and of guarantor of participatory democracy.”

The Cuban government describes the full Cuban electoral process as a form of democracy. The Cuban Ministry of External Affairs describes the candidate-selection process as deriving from “direct nomination of candidates for delegates to the municipal assemblies by the voters themselves at public assemblies,” and points out that at the elections to the municipal assemblies, voters do have a choice of candidates. The ban on election campaigning is presented as “The absence of million–dollar election campaigns where resorting to insults, slander and manipulation are the norm.”

United States 

U.S. State Department: Country Reports on Human Rights Practices: "Candidates for provincial and national office must be approved in advance by mass organizations controlled by the government. In practice a small group of leaders, under the direction of the president, selected the members of the highest policy-making bodies of the CP, the Politburo, and the Central Committee."

"In 2003 there were national elections in which 609 candidates were approved to compete for the 609 seats in the National Assembly. The CP was the only political party allowed to participate in the elections. A small minority of candidates did not belong formally to the CP but were chosen through the same government-controlled selection process. The government saturated the media and used government ministries, CP entities, and mass organizations to urge voters to cast a “unified vote” where marking one box automatically selected all candidates on the ballot form.

During the year there were elections for nearly 15 thousand local representatives to the municipal assemblies. After the first run-off election, the government reported that 96.6 percent of the electorate had voted. While the law allows citizens not to vote, CDRs often pressured neighborhood residents to cast ballots. According to the Cuban Commission for Human Rights, the government blacklisted those who did not vote. Although not a formal requirement, in practice CP membership was a prerequisite for high-level official positions and professional advancement."

European Union 

Since 1996, official European Union policy towards Cuba has stated an objective "to encourage a process of transition to a pluralist democracy via constructive engagement with the Cuban Government." This goal is shared by all member states. The E.U. describes the Cuban decision-making process thus: "Elections for the National Assembly, where only candidates approved by the local authorities can partake, take place every five years. When the National Assembly, which meets twice-yearly, is not in session the 31-member Council of State wields legislative power. The Council of Ministers, through its 9-member executive committee, exercises executive and administrative power. Although the Constitution provides for independent judiciary, it explicitly subordinates it to the National Assembly and to the Council of State. Involvement in decision-making and implementation through non-political actors has been institutionalised through national organisations, linked to the Communist Party, representing farmers, youth groups, students, women, industrial workers, etc."

Organization of American States 
Cuba was suspended from the Organization of American States (OAS) from 1962 to 2009. The Inter-American Commission on Human Rights, an organ of the OAS, prepared a report in 1997 that detailed the lack of free elections in Cuba, stating that this violated "the right to political participation set forth in Article XX of the American Declaration of the Rights and Duties of Man, which states textually that: "Every person having legal capacity is entitled to participate in the government of his country, directly or through his representatives, and to take part in popular elections, which shall be by secret ballot, and shall be honest, periodic and free.”

"The nomination of candidates for election to the Municipal Assemblies is done by nominating assemblies, in which all voters are entitled to propose candidates. In practice, however, these district assemblies are usually organized by the Committees for the Defence of the Revolution or the Communist Party, which makes the selection of an opponent of the regime most unlikely.

Other organizations 
In 1999, the U.S.-government funded organization Freedom House initiated “the Cuban Democracy Project”. The project was set up to support and encourage Cuban independent journalists, human rights activists, independent political parties, trade unions, and other organizations. Freedom House is solely responsible for the objectives and planning of the project and for its administration. Freedom House has also given Cuba the lowest rating in its: “Freedom in the World 2005” report for political rights, and the lowest rating in its “electoral democracy” category.

The Freedom House 2005 report states: “Cubans cannot change their government through democratic means. Fidel Castro dominates the political system, having transformed the country into a one-party state with the Cuban Communist Party (PCC) controlling all governmental entities from the national to the local level. Castro is responsible for every appointment and controls every lever of power in Cuba in his various roles as president of the Council of Ministers, chairman of the Council of State, commander in chief of the Revolutionary Armed Forces (FAR), and first secretary of the PCC. In October 2002, some eight million Cubans voted in tightly controlled municipal elections. On January 19, 2003, an election was held for the Cuban National Assembly, with just 609 candidates – all supported by the regime – vying for 609 seats. All political organizing outside the PCC is illegal. Political dissent, spoken or written, is a punishable offense, and those so punished frequently receive years of imprisonment for seemingly minor infractions.”

In 2002 former U.S. President Jimmy Carter spoke in Havana with support from Human Rights Watch and representing the Carter Center. Whilst calling for democratic change, Carter also stressed that he was not using a U.S. definition of “democracy.” he explained that “the term is embedded in the Universal Declaration of Human Rights, which Cuba signed in 1948. It is based on some simple premises: all citizens are born with the right to choose their own leaders, to define their own destiny, to speak freely, to organize political parties, trade unions and non-governmental groups, and to have fair and open trials.”

The 2006 report from Human Rights Watch states: “Cuba remains a Latin American anomaly: an undemocratic government that represses nearly all forms of political dissent. President Fidel Castro, now in his forty-seventh year in power, shows no willingness to consider even minor reforms. Instead, his government continues to enforce political conformity using criminal prosecutions, long- and short-term detentions, mob harassment, police warnings, surveillance, house arrests, travel restrictions, and motivated dismissals from employment. The end result is that Cubans are systematically denied basic rights to free expression, association, assembly, privacy, movement, and due process of law.”

Human Rights defenders in Cuba from Human Rights First states: “Cuba remains the only country in the Western Hemisphere to reject democracy and effectively outlaw peaceful advocacy for human rights and democratic reforms. Independent civil society in Cuba – including human rights defenders, democracy activists, and independent journalists and scholars – are the targets of constant persecution. The recognized rights to freedom of expression, association and assembly are systematically violated by the State and victims have virtually no means of redress within the judicial system.”

Critics argue that whatever the merits of the system for electing the National Assembly, that body is itself a facade for the reality of PCC rule in Cuba. The Assembly meets only twice a year for a few days which is the basis of these beliefs. The 31-member Council of State, in theory elected by the Assembly but hypothetically in practice appointed by the PCC, wields effective state power, and the PCC Politburo is assumed to be the ultimate political authority. Although the Assembly has eight standing committees, they do not exercise any effective authority over legislation. During its biannual plenums, the Assembly is said to play a passive role as audience for various government speakers. Once the Council of State's legislative proposals have been presented, they are summarily ratified by unanimous or near unanimous vote of the Assembly.

Political figures 
Many other notable political figures have commented on Cuba and democracy. At a conference held by the International Committee for Democracy in Cuba called “Towards democracy in Cuba”, former Czech leader Václav Havel stated, “democracy and prosperity in Cuba depend on the support for Cuban dissidents, the better the chances for a future peaceful transition of the Cuban society to democracy.” Havel has also described Cuba as “the biggest prison on earth”.  In 2006 Peruvian Presidential candidate and Bolivarian Ollanta Humala stated that “Obviously, according to our standards Cuba does not qualify as a democracy,” but added that Peru “is democratic, we have democratized poverty”.

See also

Communist state
Cuban dissident movement
One-party state
Liaena Hernandez Martínez

References

External links

Background Note: Cuba

Democracy
 
Politics of Cuba